WFLW (1360 AM) is a radio station  broadcasting a Classic Country format licensed to Monticello, Kentucky, United States.  The station is currently owned by Stephen W. Staples, Jr.

References

External links

FLW
Monticello, Kentucky